is a Japanese professional wrestler who works for the Mexican professional wrestling promotion Consejo Mundial de Lucha Libre (CMLL) and is billed as Okumura. Okumura originally worked for Tokyo Pro Wrestling (TPW) and later on All Japan Pro Wrestling (AJPW) in Japan but moved to Mexico in 2005 to work for CMLL full-time. Okumura usually teams up with wrestlers from Japan who visit CMLL, currently as a group known as La Ola Amarilla (Spanish for "The Yellow Wave"). Okumura and Yujiro won the 2009 version of the Gran Alternativa tournament.

Professional wrestling career

Early career
Shigeo Okumura began his professional wrestling career in 1994, making his debut on December 31, 1995, working for the Japanese promotion Tokyo Pro Wrestling (TPW). Okumura worked under both his birth name and as "Okumura" during his time in TPW. In 1996 TPW Closed and Okumura became a freelance wrestler, working for a variety of companies on the Japanese independent circuit as well as a few one-shot appearances for New Japan Pro-Wrestling (NJPW) and All Japan Pro Wrestling (AJPW). At some point between 1996 and 1999 Okumura won the CCW Heavyweight Championship and the CAWF Tag Team Championship, teaming with Nobutaka Araya. In late 1999 Okumura began working for Frontier Martial Arts Wrestling (FMW), teaming with Atsushi Onita and Mitsunobu Kikuzawa in a tournament to crown the first ever Barbed-wire Streetfight Six-man Tag Team Title. The team made it to the finals but were defeated by Mr. Pogo, Shoji Nakamaki, and Ichiro Yaguchi on December 26, 1999. On January 28, 2000, Onita, Okumura and Kikuzawa won the Barbed-Wire Street Fight Six-Man Tag Title, defeating Nakamaki, Yaguchi, and the Great Kendo for the vacant title. The trio only held the belt for four days before losing to Nakamaki, Yaguchi, and Kendo.

All Japan Pro Wrestling (2000–2004)
When Mitsuharu Misawa left AJPW to form Pro Wrestling NOAH along with a large group of AJPW wrestlers Shigeo Okumura was given a full-time contract with AJPW to fill the void left by the exodus. On September 8, 2001 Okumura and Nobutaka Araya lost to Arashi and Koki Kitahara, in a match for the vacant All Asia Tag Team Championship. When Arashi and Kitahara vacated the titles in early 2002 Okumura and Mitsuya Nagi entered the tournament to crown new champions. The team made it all the way to the final match, only to lose to Arashi and Okumura's former partner Nobutaka Araya. In 2002 Okumura participated in the "Giant Baba Cup", competing in block A. Okumura accumulated 14 points but was defeated by Mitsuya Naga in the Block final. Over the next two years Okumura would work as a mid-card wrestler, often in makeshift tag teams with other mid-card wrestlers.

Consejo Mundial de Lucha Libre (2004–present)

Early years (2004–2009)
In mid-2004 Okumura traveled to Mexico on a "learning trip", to improve his in-ring skills by being exposed to other wrestling styles than the Japanese style. In Mexico, he began working for Consejo Mundial de Lucha Libre (CMLL) as a Heel (or "bad guy") "Anti-Mexico" character. The "Anti-Mexico" character stood in contrast to Okumura's personal views as he liked living and working in Mexico so much that he has remained there since 2004. On December 5, 2004, Okumura participated in a four-man, Lucha de Apuesta (Bet match) steel cage match where the last man in the cage would have his hair shaved off as a result. The match came down to Okumura and Negro Casas and saw Casas escape, leaving Okumura to be shaved bald per Lucha traditions.

In the mid-2005 NJPW sent Shinsuke Nakamura and Hiroshi Tanahashi to Mexico, in order for them to gain international experience, just like Okumura had been sent the year before. Okumura teamed with Nakamura and Tanahashi, as well as worked as their guide and contact outside the ring. The trio worked on CMLL's 72nd Anniversary show, losing to the all-Mexican team of Último Guerrero, Rey Bucanero and Averno. On May 12, 2006, Okumura participated in CMLL's International Gran Prix, teaming with other foreign wrestlers to take on a team of eight Mexican wrestlers. Okumura was the 12th man eliminated, pinned by eventual winner Último Guerrero. On June 18, 2006, Okumura once again participated in a multi-man Steel Cage Lucha de Apuesta match, putting his hair on the line against Rey Bucanero, Universo 2000, Negro Casas, Tarzan Boy, Máximo, Heavy Metal, and El Terrible. In the end Rey Bucanero pinned Okumura, forcing him to once again be shaved bald.

In August 2006, Okumura began teaming up with Hajime Ohara and Hirooki Goto, both on a "learning trip" like Okumura had been, both young wrestlers from NJPW. The three teamed up in tag team and trios matches, taking on various Mexica combinations in low and mid-card matches. On May 11, 2007, Okumura and Goto both participated in that year's International Gran Prix teaming with Alex Koslov, Marco Corleone, Minoru Suzuki, Jushin Thunder Liger, and Último Dragón. Okumura was the second wrestler eliminated, pinned by Rey Bucanero. Ohara and Goto would both remain in Mexico for almost a year, returning to NJPW in mid-2007. In the fall of 2007 Shigeo Okumura broke his collar bone when an Asai Moonsault attempt by the inexperienced Fabián el Gitano went wrong and Fabián struck Okumura with his knees, breaking the bone. The injury sidelined Okumura for the remainder of 2007 and a large part of 2008 as his recovery from the injury combined with a long trip back to Japan kept him out of the ring.

La Ola Amarilla (2009–present)

In mid-2009 Okumura was once again teamed up with a couple of Japanese wrestlers on a learning trip; this time he teamed with No Limit (Yujiro and Naito) to form an "Anti-Mexico" faction called La Ola Amarilla (Spanish for "The Yellow Wave"). The team was given a strong push, booked to win a series of high-profile matches against various Mexican tecnicos (Faces or "good guys"). All three members of La Ola Amarila were involved in a 15-man Lucha de Apuesta steel cage match, which was the main event of CMLL's 2009 Infierno en el Ring event. Okumura escaped the cage as the fourth man and watched as Naito defeated Toscano to win the match. Throughout mid-2009 Ola Amarilla received further reinforcement as Jushin Thunder Liger toured Mexico. Okumura teamed with Liger, Yujiro, and Naito to defeat the team of Último Guerrero, Atlantis, Black Warrior and Héctor Garza, representing Mexico in one of the main events of CMLL's 76th Anniversary Show. The following week Yujiro was scheduled to team with Camorra in the 2009 Torneo Gran Alternativa tournament where a veteran teams with a rookie. Before the match Okumura made his way to the ring, objecting to Yujiro being forced to team with a Mexican and in a scripted moment, attacked Camorra and threw him out of the ring, taking his place. Yujiro and Okumura defeated Toscano and Rouge in the first round of the tournament, they were victorious against Héctor Garza and Ángel de Plata, before defeating Místico and Ángel de Oro in the finals to win the 2009 Gran Alternativa.

Following the Gran Alternativa tournament Okumura began focusing on Máximo, while No Limit began a storyline with the team of El Terrible and El Texano, Jr. Okumura and Máxmio faced off several times, usually as part of trios matches and each time the tension between the two wrestlers built. On November 5, 2009, the two faced off in a Lucha de Apuesta match, which saw Okumura win his first ever Apuesta, leaving Máximo bald in the process. While Yujiro and Naito left Mexico for NJPW by the end of 2009 Naito has already returned and announced he will work for CMLL on a regular basis and that he would be joined by NJPW rookie Taichi, keeping La Ola Amarilla alive in CMLL. On May 7, 2010, Okumura and Taichi teamed up with former IWGP World Heavyweight Champion Hiroshi Tanahashi to defeat El Hijo del Fantasma, La Máscara, and Héctor Garza to win the CMLL World Trios Championship in the main event of the weekly Friday night Super Viernes show. Ola Amarilla's reign as Trios champions only lasted two weeks as they were defeated by La Máscara, La Sombra and Máscara Dorada on May 21, 2010. On July 12, 2011, Okumura defeated El Gallo for CMLL's Guadalajara branch's Occidente Light Heavyweight Championship. He went on to lose the title to El Sagrado on July 11, 2012.

In March 2012 NJPW trainee Kyosuke Mikami came to Mexico for an extended learning tour, he was given the ring name Namajague and a mask to go with it and teamed up with Okumura. The team of Okumura and Namajague was labeled La Fiebre Amarilla ("The Yellow fever") and not simply "La Ola Amarilla". In September 2012 La Fiebre Amarilla unsuccessfully challenged for the CMLL Arena Coliseo Tag Team Championship as defending champions Fuego and Stuka, Jr. were victorious. In the months following their first match against Stuka, Jr. and Fuego, La Fiebre Amarilla developed a long-running storyline with Stuka, Jr. and Rey Cometa that evolved into the main event of the 2013 Homenaje a Dos Leyendas show contested under Luchas de Apuestas, or "bet match" rules where Namajague and Stuka, Jr. both risked their masks and Okumura and Rey Cometa would risk their hair on the outcome of the match. On March 3, 2013, Okumura and Namajague defeated Fuego and Stuka, Jr. to win the CMLL Arena Coliseo Tag Team Championship. On March 15, 2013, Okumura and Namajague were defeated by Stuka, Jr. and Rey Cometa in the main event of the 2013 Homenaje a Dos Leyendas show, forcing Okumura to have all his hair shaved off and Namajague was unmasked and had to reveal his real name, Kyosuke Mikami, as per lucha libre traditions. On November 3, Okumura and Namajague lost the Arena Coliseo Tag Team Championship to Delta and Guerrero Maya, Jr.

In January 2015, Okumura returned to Japan to take part in the Fantastica Mania 2015 tour, during which he unsuccessfully challenged Ángel de Oro for the CMLL World Light Heavyweight Championship.

Championships and accomplishments
Can-Am Wrestling Federation
CAWF Tag Team Championship (1 time) – with Nobutaka Araya
Consejo Mundial de Lucha Libre
CMLL Arena Coliseo Tag Team Championship (1 time) – with Namajague
CMLL World Trios Championship (1 time) – with Hiroshi Tanahashi and Taichi
Occidente Light Heavyweight Championship (1 time)
Gran Alternativa (2009) – with Yujiro
Costa Rica Wrestling Embassy
CWE World Championship (1 time)
Onita Pro
Barbed-Wire Streetfight Six-Tag Team Championhship (1 time) – with Atsushi Onita and Mitsunobu Kikuzawa
Tokyo Pro Wrestling
CCW Heavyweight Championship (1 time)

Luchas de Apuestas record

Footnotes

References

1972 births
Japanese expatriate sportspeople in Mexico
Japanese male professional wrestlers
Living people
People from Ikeda, Osaka
Sportspeople from Osaka Prefecture
20th-century professional wrestlers
21st-century professional wrestlers
CMLL World Trios Champions